Munger Road is a road in DuPage and Cook counties in Illinois, running through the villages of Bartlett and Wayne.

The railroad crossing near Stearns Road is said to be the site of supernatural activity as noted in a 2011 movie Munger Road.

Supernatural phenomena 
Munger Road is known as a legendary haunted site, drawing visitors to experience supernatural phenomena at the railroad tracks. According to the legend, a school bus full of children was hit by a train after becoming stuck on the tracks, killing everyone inside. Reportedly, if visitors at Munger Road sprinkle baby powder on their car bumpers and sit on the tracks with their car in neutral, the spirits of the children push the car off the tracks to safety, and their handprints can be seen in the powder.

References

External links 
 MungerRoad.com

Roads in Illinois
Transportation in DuPage County, Illinois